Fidel is a 2009 Filipino indie film, directed by Mark Shandii Bacolod and produced and written by Charlotte Dianco.

The film tells the story of a character named Fidel, an Overseas Filipino Worker (OFW) working at Dubai, who is on death row for killing his Arab male employer for raping him. It was reported that the film was originally made to create awareness for Filipino men who have been abused but are embarrassed to file an action against the perpetrators.

Plot 
An overseas Filipino worker is on death row in Dubai for killing his Arab male employer for raping him. As the news progressed in the Philippines, a female reporter named Vega starts digging up stories about him, and that in turn garnered attention from local government officials to take action. But for Fidel, he doesn't want any help, as he has insisted that he purposely killed his employer, however Vega finds this hard to believe as she investigates his past of a loving boy-next-door type who has a loving family and that his profile doesn't fit the picture of a killer. Sister Lourdes, a Filipino nun who is based in Dubai and visits Fidel regularly in jail also wants to know the truth.

Cast
 Lance Raymundo as Fidel
 Snooky Serna as Sister Lourdes
 Marife Necesito as Jovi
 Maria Isabel Lopez as Minda
 Andrea del Rosario as Vega
 Von Arroyo as Chris
 Fonz Deza as Poldo
 Cherry Mae Canton as Daisy
 RJ Revilla as Milo
 Ana Abad-Santos as a Malacanang Representative
 Ces Aldaba as a Politician
 Bong Cabrera		
 Justin De Leon as Ramon
 Martin Dela Paz as Caleb
 Nonoy Froilan as Father Allan
 Jerald Guevara as Adi
 Jon Hall as Al-Jared Ahmed
 R.R. Herrera as Human Rights Lawyer
 P.J. Lanot as a DFA Official
 Jao Mapa as Goonie
 Alex Vincent Medina as Fidel's friend
 IC Mendoza as Boy George
 Mosang as Ditas
 Jonathan Neri as Fidel's friend
 Roeder as Peter

Special screenings 
 The film was a semi-finalist at the 2007 Cinemalaya Independent Film Festival.
 The film was first screened at the Armed Forces of the Philippines (AFP) Theater last Aug. 28, 2009.
 The film was the official selection at the first Filipino International Film Festival in Los Angeles (FIFFLA).
 It was also featured at the IndieSine in Robinson Galleria last Jan. 17, 2010, where only indie film are shown.

References

External links
 

2009 films
Philippine drama films
2000s Tagalog-language films